Azurém is a civil parish in the municipality of Guimarães in the Braga District of Portugal. The population in 2021 was 9,090, in an area of 2.9 km2.

References

Freguesias of Guimarães